Dingler is an unincorporated community in Randolph County, Alabama, United States.

A post office called Dingler was established in 1880, and remained in operation until it was discontinued in 1905.

References

Unincorporated communities in Randolph County, Alabama
Unincorporated communities in Alabama